Xavier López Rodríguez (born February 17, 1935), better known as "Chabelo", is a Mexican American actor, comedian, television presenter and children's music singer who has been working on television for over sixty years. "Chabelo" has participated in more than thirty motion pictures and recorded more than thirty musical albums. He also has produced many shows like La Cuchufleta and La Güereja Quiere Más. However, his most famous TV show was En Familia con Chabelo, which was broadcast every Sunday morning on Televisa's Canal de las Estrellas. This show consisted of contests with people from the audience, gifts and games and was mainly for children. The program ended on Sunday, December 20, 2015 after 47 years.

Artistic career
Xavier López's career really began when he met a famous couple of actors, whose names were "Panseco y Gamboa". Panseco worked on radio, and Gamboa (Ramiro), worked on TV. This pair was already known in Mexico and they taught Chabelo the basics of the TV business.

Xavier López was hired as his “Chabelo” character to be the spokesman of Pepsi Cola, for which he traveled all over North and South America. After the contract, he found himself unemployable due to his strong association with the Pepsi brand. He was hired for a show in New York City for a fraction of what he was used to charging, and ended up touring the US for six months with Tongolele. After the tour, he negotiated a return to TV for a half hour daily show. He also appeared as "Panchito" in Cantinflas film El Extra (1962).

En Familia con Chabelo

López had the idea of doing a show where parents and children could participate and enjoy these mornings together. En Familia con Chabelo (In Family with Chabelo) is well known in Latin America, it is a show with games, contests and gifts where Lopez plays the role of TV host, and presents himself as a child named Chabelo. On December 30, 2012, the show was awarded a Guinness Record for its 44 years of uninterrupted broadcast. Xavier López was awarded another Guinness Record for portraying the Chabelo character for over 57 years.

People involved in this program are children and their parents, with whom Chabelo interacts and gets them to participate in many contests. At the end of the show there is a famous contest called the Catafixia.

Other shows
Chabelo has been featured in more than thirty films and recorded more than thirty albums. He also has produced many programs like La Escuelita VIP,  and  Los Simuladores.

See also
 Los Cuates de Chabelo, a 1999 album

References

1935 births
Living people
Male actors from Chicago
Mexican male comedians
Mexican male film actors
Mexican male telenovela actors
Mexican male television actors
Mexican television personalities